Garrett List (September 10, 1943 – December 27, 2019) was an American trombonist, vocalist, and composer.

List was born in Phoenix, Arizona. He studied at California State University, Long Beach, and the Juilliard School. He was a member of Italian band Musica Elettronica Viva from 1971. In 1980, he began teaching at the Royal Conservatory of Liège. List died in Liège, Belgium, aged 76.

Discography

As leader
 Your Own Self (Opus One, 1972)
 American Images (Horo, 1978)
 Fire & Ice (Lovely Music, 1982)
 The Real Live Orchestra (Igloo, 1986)
 The Unbearably Light (Music for Treesasbl, 1995)
 The Voyage (Carbon 7, 1998)
 The New York Takes (Carbon 7, 1998)

As sideman
With Anthony Braxton
 Creative Orchestra Music 1976 (Arista, 1976)
 Four Compositions (Solo, Duo & Trio) 1982/1988 (hatART, 1989)

With Willem Breuker
 Driebergen Zeist (BV Haast, 1983)
 To Remain (BV Haast, 1989)
 The Parrot (BV Haast, 1996)
 Kurt Weill (BV Haast, 1998)

With Johnny Copeland
 Copeland Special (Demon, 1981)
 Texas Party (Orbis, 1995)

With Arthur Russell
 First Thought Best Thought (Audika, 2006)
 Love Is Overtaking Me (Audika, 2008)

With others
 Morton Feldman, Morton Feldman (Edition, 1994)
 Keshavan Maslak, Keshavan Maslak (Atman, 1977)
 Musica Elettronica Viva, United Patchwork (Horo, 1978)
 Frederic Rzewski, Attica/Coming Together/Les Moutons De Panurge (Opus One, 1974)
 Marianne Schroeder, Braxton & Stockhausen (hat ART, 1984)
 Yoshi Wada, Earth Horns With Electronic Drone (Edition, Omega Point, EM 2009)
 Christian Wolff, Ten Exercises (New World, 2006)
 La Monte Young, Dream House 78' 17" (Shandar, 1974)

Further reading
 Zimmerman, Walter, Desert Plants – Conversations with 23 American Musicians, Berlin: Beginner Press in cooperation with Mode Records, 2020 (originally published in 1976 by A.R.C., Vancouver). The 2020 edition includes a cd featuring the original interview recordings with Larry Austin, Robert Ashley, Jim Burton, John Cage, Philip Corner, Morton Feldman, Philip Glass, Joan La Barbara, Garrett List, Alvin Lucier, John McGuire, Charles Morrow, J.B. Floyd (on Conlon Nancarrow), Pauline Oliveros, Charlemagne Palestine, Ben Johnston (on Harry Partch), Steve Reich, David Rosenboom, Frederic Rzewski, Richard Teitelbaum, James Tenney, Christian Wolff, and La Monte Young.

References

External links
 Jazz in Belgium bio
 Bernard Legros, Garrett List. La musique et l'avenir. Postface de Steve Houben, Jacques Flament Editions, 2014.

1943 births
2019 deaths
Musicians from Phoenix, Arizona
20th-century classical composers
21st-century classical composers
20th-century jazz composers
21st-century jazz composers
American male classical composers
American classical composers
American jazz trombonists
Male trombonists
20th-century classical trombonists
20th-century American composers
21st-century classical trombonists
20th-century American male musicians
21st-century American male musicians
American male jazz musicians
Classical musicians from Arizona